Pseudasteron is a genus of spiders in the family Zodariidae. It was first described in 2001 by Jocqué & Baehr. , it contains only one species, Pseudasteron simile, found in Queensland.

References

Zodariidae
Monotypic Araneomorphae genera
Spiders of Australia